The Chyrandy Botanical Reserve is located in Kadamjay District of Batken Region of Kyrgyzstan. It was established in 1975 with a purpose of conservation of the reference area of low-land desert dry steppe zone flora and habitats of endemic Tulipa rosea Vved. and Tulipa ferganica Vved.. The botanical reserve occupies 500 hectares.

References

Batken Region
Botanical reserves in Kyrgyzstan
Protected areas established in 1975